Courtens is a surname. Notable people with the surname include:

 Michelle Courtens (born 1981), Dutch singer
 Franz Courtens (1854–1943), Belgian painter

See also
 Courten, surname